Banana  is a 2015 comedy-drama film written and directed by Andrea Jublin.

For this film Jublin was nominated for David di Donatello for Best New Director.

Cast  
  Marco Todisco  as  Banana
  Camilla Filippi as  Emma
  Gianfelice Imparato as   Banana's Father
  Giselda Volodi as   Banana's Mother
 Anna Bonaiuto as  Professor Colonna
 Giorgio Colangeli as The Principal
  Andrea Jublin as  Gianni 
  Beatrice Modica as  Jessica

See also 
 List of Italian films of 2015

References

External links 
 

2010s coming-of-age comedy-drama films
Italian coming-of-age comedy-drama films
2015 directorial debut films
2015 films
Films scored by Nicola Piovani
2010s Italian films